Cosmoclostis brachybela is a moth of the family Pterophoridae. It was described by Thomas Bainbrigge Fletcher in 1947 and is known from South Africa.

References

Endemic moths of South Africa
Pterophorini
Moths of Africa
Moths described in 1947